Taling Chan Station is a railway station located in Taling Chan District, Bangkok. It is operated by the State Railway of Thailand and serves two routes: the Southern Main Line and the Bang Sue–Taling Chan SRT Light Red Line. It is located 22.136 kilometres from Bangkok railway station. Taling Chan Junction serves as a junction for the mainline from Bangkok and the short branchline to Thon Buri railway station, near Siriraj Hospital.

Taling Chan Station is also the terminus for the current Light Red Line from Bang Sue. In the past, the station building was a wooden structure with about 5 platforms. Since 2009, the station has been rebuilt to concrete and other tracks were removed for the SRT Light Red Line new tracks.

Train services 
Ordinary 261/262 Bangkok (Hua Lamphong)–Hua Hin–Bangkok (Hua Lamphong)
Rapid 171/172 Krung Thep Aphiwat–Sungai Kolok–Krung Thep Aphiwat
Rapid 169/170 Krung Thep Aphiwat–Yala–Krung Thep Aphiwat
Commuter 355/356 Bangkok (Hua Lamphong)–Suphan Buri–Bangkok (Hua Lamphong)
Ordinary 251/252 Thon Buri–Prachuap Khiri Khan–Thon Buri
Ordinary 254/255 Lang Suan–Thon Buri–Lang Suan
Ordinary 257/258 Thon Buri–Nam Tok–Thon Buri
Ordinary 259/260 Thon Buri–Nam Tok–Thon Buri
Ordinary 351/352 Thon Buri–Ratchaburi–Thon Buri
Rapid 177/178 Thon Buri–Lang Suan–Thon Buri
Thon Buri–Nakhon Pathom–Thon Buri Feeder Services
SRT Light Red Line services

1979 Taling Chan rail accident 
The accident occurred at dawn on 21 August 1979. A congested Ratchaburi-Thon Buri train (No.165, now 352) approached the intersection around Taling Chan Junction and was collided by a freight train from Bang Sue Junction to Padang Besar, due to having gone through a red signal. The freight train collided into the passenger train in the middle section and caused derailments for both trains. There were 51 deaths and 138 injured, the majority of the passengers being students and merchants coming for trade near Thon Buri Station. The accident was one of the most severe rail disasters in Thailand.

Gallery

References 

 http://phanuphong002.wordpress.com/
 http://www.ratchakitcha.soc.go.th/DATA/PDF/2532/D/166/51.PDF
 http://www.railway.co.th

Railway stations in Bangkok